This is a list of universities in Tokyo, Japan. See also Education in Tokyo.

National universities

Public universities
Advanced Institute of Industrial Technology
Tokyo Metropolitan University

Private universities

Junior colleges

Tokyo
Universities
Tokyo